Ingmar Malte Hoerr (born 1968 in Neckarsulm) is a German biologist. He pioneered vaccinology research concerning the use of RNA and is a founder of the German biotechnology company CureVac. He created the initial technology used in RNA vaccines and has reportedly been nominated for a Nobel Prize. He is currently an Ambassador for the European Innovation Council for the years 2021–2027.

Early life and education 
Hoerr graduated from the Johannes-Kepler-Realschule in Wendlingen am Neckar in 1985  and then attended an agricultural high school in Nürtingen, where he obtained his Abitur in 1988. From 1988 to 1990, he performed civilian service at the DRK Nürtingen as a paramedic. From 1990 to 1996 he studied biology at the University of Tübingen. During his studies, he spent a year at Madurai Kamaraj University, India.

Career

Career in academia 
Hoerr did experimental research on the stabilization of messenger ribonucleic acid (mRNA). In 1999, he received his PhD from Günther Jung, Institute of Organic Chemistry, in cooperation with Hans-Georg Rammensee, Institute of Immunology and Cell Biology (both: University of Tübingen) on the topic of RNA vaccines for the induction of specific cytotoxic T lymphocytes (CTL) and antibodies. In 2000, Hoerr published his doctoral thesis entitled "RNA vaccine for the induction of specific cytotoxic T-lymphocytes (CTL) and antibodies." In his thesis, Hoerr discovered that ribonucleic acid can be stabilized. This discovery made it easy to use ribonucleic acid for the development of vaccines and immunotherapies.

The dissertation investigated the development of RNA vaccines that will play a central role in the fight against COVID-19 starting in 2020. At the time, he vaccinated laboratory mice with an RNA construct and showed that such a vaccine does not immediately decay, as previously thought. Rather, stabilized RNA stimulates the immune system to produce antibodies and activate T cells that destroy pathogens. As early as 9 September 1999, Hoerr applied for a first patent for the new technology. In 2008 and 2009, the first clinical trials for the use of mRNA as a cancer vaccine were already underway.

Bill Gates, whose foundation invested in CureVac, rated Hoerr's pioneering work as groundbreaking in an interview with German newspaper Handelsblatt: "The first mRNA vaccines,developed by Pfizer-Biontech and Moderna in 2020, are the product of a multitude of ideas and discoveries by German scientist Ingmar Hoerr, who spent twenty years experimenting with messenger RNA."

As the success of the m-RNA vaccines grew, so did media interest in Hoerr. Der Spiegel ranked him among the pioneers of m-RNA vaccines, as did Die Zeit or Süddeutsche Zeitung and conducted interviews. There were appearances on popular German talk shows such as Lanz or Nachtcafe. International interest ranged from the French L'Express to the New York Times.

In May 2021, Ingmar Hoerr and Florian von der Mülbe, together with their partners, Sara Hörr and Kiriakoula Kapousouzi, founded the Morpho Foundation, a foundation for the promotion of culture and health projects.

Corporate career 
In 2000, Hoerr, together with colleagues from the lab groups of Günther Jung and Hans-Georg Rammensee, founded the biopharmaceutical company CureVac.

In 2018, Hoerr gave up his office as chairman of the board and changed – as Chairman – to the supervisory board. Daniel L. Menichella was hired in that position in order to develop R&D and plants in the U.S., but the board changed its mind in 2020 and fired Menichella.

On 11 March 2020, Hoerr took over the position of CEO again at CureVac, replacing his interim successor Menichella. Later, Hoerr was replaced by Jean Stephenne as chairman of the supervisory board.

In August 2020, Franz-Werner Haas replaced Hoerr as chief executive officer, after Hoerr suffered a severe health issue that March.

Recognition 

 2018 – Honorary Senator Universität Tübingen
 2020 – Honorary Citizen of the City of Tübingen
 2021 – Medal of Honor Medical Faculty Universität Duisburg-Essen
 2021 − Meyer-Schwickerath-Preis der Stiftung Universitätsmedizin Essen für seine Grundlagenforschung zur Boten-Ribonukleinsäure
 2021 – Max-Bergmann-Medaille für die Entwicklung der messenger-RNA- (mRNA)-Impfstoffe als neuartigem Wirkstoffprinzip
 2021 – German Innovation Award, Innovator of the Year

Patents 
 Günther Jung, Ingmar Hoerr, Hans-Georg Rammensee, Reinhard Obst: Transfer von mRNAs unter Verwendung von polykationischen Verbindungen. EP1083232. Erstveröffentlichung 9. September 1999, Patentinhaber: CureVac.
 Florian Von der Mülbe, Ingmar Hoerr, Steve Pascolo: Stabilisierte mRNA mit erhöhtem G/C-Gehalt und optimierter Codon Usage für die Gentherapie. WO2002098443. Erstveröffentlichung 12. Dezember 2002, Patentinhaber: CureVac.
 Ingmar Hoerr, Jochen Probst, Steve Pascolo: RNA-coded antibody. WO2008083949. Erstveröffentlichung 17. Juli 2008, Patentinhaber: CureVac.
 Ingmar Hoerr, Steve Pascolo: Optimierte Injektionsformulierung für mRNA. Veröffentlichungstag und Patenterteilung 19 June 2019, Europäische Patentschrift Nr EP 3 153 179 B1, Patentinhaber: CureVac.

Publications

Literature

References 

21st-century German biologists
Biotechnologists
Living people
1968 births
Vaccinologists